Mary Elizabeth Clarke (born September 25, 1991), better known as Emmy Clarke, is a former American actress.

Early life

Clarke was born in Mineola, New York, but at the age of one she moved with her parents to Houston, Texas. At age six, she moved to Woking, UK, where she attended TASIS England before moving to New York City at age 11. The nickname "Emmy" is derived from her first two initials. She has two siblings, Patrick (older) and Bridget (younger). She now lives in Fairfield County, Connecticut.

Career
Clarke's first acting role was in the 2003 television film My House in Umbria, for which she won the Young Artist Award for Best Performance in a TV Movie, Miniseries, or Special – Supporting Young Actress  in 2004. Beginning with the season three episode "Mr. Monk and the Red Herring", Clarke had a recurring role on the TV series Monk as Julie Teeger, the daughter of Adrian Monk's second assistant Natalie. She also had a role in Fur, a film released on November 10, 2006.

Filmography

Film

Television

References

External links

1991 births
21st-century American actresses
Actresses from Houston
American child actresses
American film actresses
American television actresses
Living people
People educated at the American School in England
People from Mineola, New York